Amblydoras gonzalezi is a species of thorny catfish found in Colombia and Venezuela.  It occurs in the Orinoco River basin and in the Casiquiare canal.  This species grows to a length of  SL.

The fish is named in honor of civil engineer Marcelo González Molina (1923-2000), who through his connections, provided the collectors access to the type locality.

References
 

Doradidae
Freshwater fish of Colombia
Fish of Venezuela
Taxa named by Augustín Fernández-Yépez
Fish described in 1968